Swathanthryam Ardharathriyil (also spelt Swathandriam Ardharathriyil) is a 2018 Indian Malayalam-language  action thriller film directed by Tinu Pappachan and written by Dileep Kurian. It was produced by B. C. Joshi, with Lijo Jose Pellissery and Chemban Vinod Jose as co-producers. The film stars Antony Varghese, Vinayakan, and Chemban Vinod Jose. It was released in India on 31 March 2018. The film was remade in Tamil as Kumari Maavattathin Thugs.

Plot 
The movie begins with Betty being arrested on murder charges, while Jacob Varghese, her lover, is on the run. However, he tactfully misleads the police and flees with Betty. They somehow stayed hidden for days. Later, on the way to collect passports, Betty gets involved in a protest and is beaten up, and gets admitted to the hospital. Meanwhile, Jacob gets arrested.

In the police station, Jacob is ruthlessly handled by the police. They undress him and thoroughly checks him to see whether he has hidden anything. Jacob finds his inmates as arrogant and unsympathetic, and decides to escape. He shares his desire with Simon, another inmate. Initially, Simon disagrees, but he agrees after he wants to meet his family. The advocate of Appachan, a rich businessman, questions Jacob about the location of a man called Charlie, but Jacob remains calm and says, he doesn't know. Simon asks Jacob about Appachan and Charlie, and Jacob reveals his story.

Jacob was the manager of Appachan's company, and Charlie was the driver. Charlie was keen to take revenge on Appachan as he killed his father. During this time, Jacob met and fell in love with Betty. The SI of the area, S.I. James, kidnapped and killed a girl named Indu, with Betty being the sole witness. In court, Betty gives his name. The SI, on bail, tortures Betty, and Jacob, in anger, kills him... Jacob tells everything to Charlie, who in turn robs Rs. 35 million from Appachan's company. Charlie goes to Australia and promises Jacob that he'll come back to take him and Betty along with him. Betty is in a convent from where she's arrested.

Currently, Simon and Jacob plan to escape and somehow makes the other inmates leave their cell. Meanwhile, a thief named Devassy and a migrant worker Ramu arrives, and they too plans to escape with Simon and Jacob. However, the police find marijuana in Simon's cell. Jacob digs a hole through the toilet of his cell, all the way down the drainage and into the compound. He starts building the tunnel a bit-by-bit with the help of Devassy, Ramu and two other thieves, who are basically twins who initially hated the escape plan but later agreed after learning that they've been charged falsely.

A new inmate, who's arrested on the charge of molestation, arrives. Jacob and his gang somehow evade him. Udayan, with whom Jacob had a fight earlier, comes to their cell to fail their plan. Appachan sends some criminals to the jail to brutally torture Jacob so that he'll confess where Charlie is and then kill him. The criminal gang involves Simon, who in turn helps Jacob and his gang. Jacob blackmails Udayan and asks him to remain silent so he can also escape.

During the night, Jacob, Simon, Devassy, Udayan, Ramu and the twin brothers start their escape down the tunnel. In the tunnel, Jacob and Udayan get into a fight, but Jacob successfully beats Udayan and escapes. The police are alerted, and Udayan is caught and brutally beaten. They start chasing the other men who escaped. All of them escape by jumping into a river, except the twin brothers, one of whom were hit by a police jeep.

At the end, Jacob is with Betty in a boat. It's revealed that he managed to take Betty out of the hospital, Devassy and Ramu will reach West Bengal in 2–3 days, Simon and his gang escape in another boat, and he's also made bail arrangements for the twin brothers. They're going to Australia, where Charlie is.

Cast 
 Antony Varghese as Jacob Varghese
 Vinayakan as Simon
 Chemban Vinod Jose as Devassya
 Sinoj Varghese as Girijan
 Rajesh Sharma as Jail warden
 Tito Wilson as Udayan
 Aswathy Manoharan as Betty
 Lijo Jose Pellissery as Appachan's lawyer
 Kichu Tellus as Charlie
 Anil Nedumangad as SI James
 Dinesh Prabhakar as Murugan
 Arya Salim as Simon's Wife
Ramu

Production 
Swathanthryam Ardharathriyil (freedom at midnight) is the directorial debut of Tinu Pappachan, a former associate-director to Lijo Jose Pellissery (who also co-produced the film with Chemban Vinod Jose) and scripted by Dileep Kurian, a close friend to him. Pappachan describes the film as an "action thriller" with the story set in a sub-jail and revolving around prisoners in remand. The jail sequences were shot in Thiruvananthapuram, a jail set was used for the extensive night shoots; art director was Gokul Das.

Release 
The film was released in India on 31 March 2018, distributed by B. Unnikrishnan's RD Illuminations.

References

External links 
 

2010s Malayalam-language films
2018 action thriller films
2018 directorial debut films
2018 films
Films scored by Deepak Alexander
Films scored by Jakes Bejoy
Films shot in Thiruvananthapuram
Indian action thriller films
Malayalam films remade in other languages